is a former Japanese football player.

Club statistics

References

External links

1986 births
Living people
Association football people from Miyazaki Prefecture
Japanese footballers
J1 League players
J2 League players
Sanfrecce Hiroshima players
Tokushima Vortis players
Association football defenders